Oracle bones are pieces of ox scapula and turtle plastron, which were used for pyromancy – a form of divination – in ancient China, mainly during the late Shang dynasty. Scapulimancy is the correct term if ox scapulae were used for the divination, plastromancy if turtle plastrons were used.

Diviners would submit questions to deities regarding future weather, crop planting, the fortunes of members of the royal family, military endeavors, and other similar topics. These questions were carved onto the bone or shell in oracle bone script using a sharp tool. Intense heat was then applied with a metal rod until the bone or shell cracked due to thermal expansion. The diviner would then interpret the pattern of cracks and write the prognostication upon the piece as well. Pyromancy with bones continued in China into the Zhou dynasty, but the questions and prognostications were increasingly written with brushes and cinnabar ink, which degraded over time.

The oracle bones bear the earliest known significant corpus of ancient Chinese writing, using an early form of Chinese characters. The inscriptions contain around 5,000 different characters, though only about 1,200 of them have been identified with certainty. They provide important information on the late Shang period, and scholars have reconstructed the Shang royal genealogy from the cycle of ancestral sacrifices they record. When they were discovered in the end of the nineteenth century and deciphered in the early twentieth century, these records confirmed the existence of the Shang, which some scholars had until then doubted.

Oraculology is the discipline for the study of oracle bones and the oracle bone script.

Discovery

The Shang-dynasty oracle bones are thought to have been unearthed periodically by local farmers since as early as the Sui and Tang dynasties and perhaps starting as early as the Han dynasty, but local inhabitants did not realize what the bones were and generally reburied them. During the 19th century, villagers in the area digging in the fields discovered a number of bones and used them as "dragon bones", a reference to the traditional Chinese medicine practice of grinding up Pleistocene fossils into tonics or poultices. The turtle shell fragments were prescribed for malaria, while the other animal bones were used in powdered form to treat knife wounds.

In 1899, an antiques dealer from Shandong Province searching for Chinese bronzes in the area acquired a number of oracle bones from locals, several of which he sold to Wang Yirong, the chancellor of the Imperial Academy in Beijing.  Wang was a knowledgeable collector of Chinese bronzes and is believed to be the first person in modern times to recognize the oracle bones' markings as ancient Chinese writing similar to that on Zhou dynasty bronzes. A legendary tale relates that Wang was sick with malaria, and his scholar friend Liu E was visiting him and helped examine his medicine. They discovered, before it was ground into powder, that it bore strange glyphs, which they, having studied the ancient bronze inscriptions, recognized as ancient writing. As Xu Yahui states:

It is not known how Wang and Liu actually came across these "dragon bones", but Wang is credited with being the first to recognize their significance. Wang committed suicide in 1900 in connection with his involvement in the Boxer Rebellion, and his son later sold the bones to friend Liu E, who published the first book of rubbings of the oracle bone inscriptions in 1903. News of the discovery of the oracle bones spread quickly throughout China and among foreign collectors and scholars, and the market for oracle bones exploded, though many collectors sought to keep the location of the bones' source a secret.  Although scholars tried to find their source, antique dealers falsely claimed that the bones came from Tangyin in Henan. In 1908, scholar Luo Zhenyu discovered the source of the bones near Anyang and realized that the area was the site of the last Shang dynasty capital.

Decades of uncontrolled digs followed to fuel the antiques trade, and many of these pieces eventually entered collections in Europe, the US, Canada and Japan. The first Western collector was the American missionary Frank H. Chalfant (1862–1914).

Only a small number of dealers and collectors knew the location of the source of the oracle bones or visited it until they were found by Canadian missionary James Mellon Menzies, the first person to scientifically excavate, study, and decipher them. He was the first to conclude that the bones were records of divination from the Shang dynasty, and was the first to come up with a method of dating them (in order to avoid being fooled by fakes). In 1917 he published the first scientific study of the bones, including 2,369 drawings and inscriptions and thousands of ink rubbings. Through the donation of local people and his own archaeological excavations, he acquired the largest private collection in the world, over 35,000 pieces. He insisted that his collection remain in China, though some were sent to Canada by colleagues who were worried that they would be either destroyed or stolen during the Japanese invasion of China in 1937. The Chinese still acknowledge the pioneering contribution of Menzies as "the foremost western scholar of Yin-Shang culture and oracle bone inscriptions". His former residence in Anyang was declared a "Protected Treasure" in 2004, and the James Mellon Menzies Memorial Museum for Oracle Bone Studies was established.

Official excavations

By the time of the establishment of the Institute of History and Philology headed by Fu Sinian at the Academia Sinica in 1928, the source of the oracle bones had been traced back to modern Xiǎotún village at Anyang in Henan Province. Official archaeological excavations in 1928–1937 led by Li Ji, the father of Chinese archaeology, discovered 20,000 oracle bone pieces, which now form the bulk of the Academia Sinica's collection in Taiwan and constitute about 1/5 of the total discovered. When deciphered, the inscriptions on the oracle bones turned out to be the records of the divinations performed for or by the royal household. These, together with royal-sized tombs, proved beyond a doubt for the first time the existence of the Shang dynasty, which had recently been doubted, and the location of its last capital, Yin. Today, Xiǎotún at Anyang is thus also known as the Ruins of Yin, or Yinxu.

Publication
Oracle bone inscriptions were published as they were discovered, in fascicles. Subsequently, many collections of inscriptions were also published. The following are the main collections.

 (1954)

 (1951)

Observing that the citation of these different works was becoming unwieldy, an effort was made to comprehensively publish all bones hitherto discovered. The 20 volumes contain reproductions of over 55,000 fragments. A separate work published in 1999 contains transcriptions of the inscriptions into standard characters.

Dating

The vast majority of the inscribed oracle bones were found at the Yinxu site in modern Anyang, and date to the reigns of the last nine kings of the Shang dynasty. The diviners named on the bones have been assigned to five periods by Dong Zuobin:

The kings were involved in divination in all periods, but in later periods most divinations were done personally by the king.
The extant inscriptions are not evenly distributed across these periods, with 55% coming from period I and 31% from periods III and IV.
A few oracle bones date to the beginning of the subsequent Zhou dynasty.

The earliest oracle bones (corresponding to the reigns of Wu Ding and Zu Geng) record dates using only the 60-day cycle of stems and branches, though sometimes the month was also given.
Attempts to determine an absolute chronology focus on a number of lunar eclipses recorded in inscriptions by the Bīn group, who worked during the reign of Wu Ding, possibly extending into the reign of Zu Geng.
Assuming that the 60-day cycle continued uninterrupted into the securely dated period, scholars have sought to match the recorded dates with calculated dates of eclipses.
There is general agreement on four of these, spanning dates from 1198 to 1180 BCE.
A fifth is assigned by some scholars to 1201 BCE.
From these data, the Xia–Shang–Zhou Chronology Project, relying on the statement in the "Against Luxurious Ease" chapter of the Book of Documents that the reign of Wu Ding lasted 59 years, dated it from 1250 to 1192 BCE. David Keightley argued that the "Against Luxurious Ease" chapter should not be treated as a historical text, because was composed much later, presents reign lengths as moral judgements, and gives other reign lengths that are contradicted by oracle bone evidence.
He dated the reign of Wu Ding as approximately from 1200 to 1181 BCE. Ken-ichi Takashima dates the earliest oracle bone inscriptions to 1230 BCE. Twenty-six oracle bone divinations of Wu Ding's reign have been radiocarbon dated to 1254–1197 BC±10 years.

Period V inscriptions often identify numbered ritual cycles, making it easier to estimate the reign lengths of the last two kings.
The start of this period is dated 1100–1090 BCE by Keightley and 1101 BCE by the XSZ project.
Most scholars now agree that the Zhou conquest of the Shang took place close to 1046 or 1045 BCE, over a century later than the traditional date.

Shang divination
Since divination (-mancy) was by heat or fire (pyro-) and most often on plastrons or scapulae, the terms pyromancy, plastromancy and scapulimancy are often used for this process.

Materials

The oracle bones are mostly tortoise plastrons (ventral or belly shells, probably female) and ox scapulae (shoulder blades), although some are the carapace (dorsal or back shells) of tortoises, and a few are ox rib bones, scapulae of sheep, boars, horses and deer, and some other animal bones. The skulls of deer, oxen and humans have also been found with inscriptions on them, although these are very rare and appear to have been inscribed for record keeping or practice rather than for actual divination; in one case, inscribed deer antlers were reported, but Keightley (1978) reports that they are fake. Neolithic diviners in China had long been heating the bones of deer, sheep, pigs and cattle for similar purposes; evidence for this in Liaoning has been found dating to the late fourth millennium BCE. However, over time, the use of ox bones increased, and use of tortoise shells does not appear until early Shang culture. The earliest tortoise shells found that had been prepared for divinatory use (i.e., with chiseled pits) date to the earliest Shang stratum at Erligang (Zhengzhou, Henan). By the end of the Erligang, the plastrons were numerous, and at Anyang, scapulae and plastrons were used in roughly equal numbers. Due to the use of these shells in addition to bones, early references to the oracle bone script often used the term "shell and bone script", but since tortoise shells are actually a bony material, the more concise term "oracle bones" is applied to them as well.

The bones or shells were first sourced and then prepared for use. Their sourcing is significant because some of them (especially many of the shells) are believed to have been presented as tribute to the Shang, which is valuable information about diplomatic relations of the time. We know this because notations were often made on them recording their provenance (e.g., tribute of how many shells from where and on what date). For example, one notation records that " sent 250 (tortoise shells)", identifying this as, perhaps, a statelet within the Shang sphere of influence. These notations were generally made on the back of the shell's bridge (called bridge notations), the lower carapace, or the xiphiplastron (tail edge). Some shells may have been from locally raised tortoises, however. Scapula notations were near the socket or a lower edge. Some of these notations were not carved after being written with a brush, proving (along with other evidence) the use of the writing brush in Shang times. Scapulae are assumed to have generally come from the Shang's own livestock, perhaps those used in ritual sacrifice, although there are records of cattle sent as tribute as well, including some recorded via marginal notations.

Preparation

The bones or shells were cleaned of meat and then prepared by sawing, scraping, smoothing and even polishing to create convenient, flat surfaces. The predominance of scapulae and later of plastrons is also thought to be related to their convenience as large, flat surfaces needing minimal preparation. There is also speculation that only female tortoise shells were used, as these are significantly less concave. Pits or hollows were then drilled or chiseled partway through the bone or shell in orderly series. At least one such drill has been unearthed at Erligang, exactly matching the pits in size and shape. The shape of these pits evolved over time and is an important indicator for dating the oracle bones within various sub-periods in the Shang dynasty. The shape and depth also helped determine the nature of the crack that would appear. The number of pits per bone or shell varied widely.

Cracking and interpretation

Divinations were typically carried out for the Shang kings in the presence of a diviner. A very few oracle bones were used in divination by other members of the royal family or nobles close to the king. By the latest periods, the Shang kings took over the role of diviner personally.

During a divination session, the shell or bone was anointed with blood, and in an inscription section called the "preface", the date was recorded using the Heavenly Stems and Earthly Branches, and the diviner name was noted. Next, the topic of divination (called the "charge") was posed, such as whether a particular ancestor was causing a king's toothache. A wide variety of topics were asked, essentially anything of concern to the royal house of Shang, from illness, birth and death, to weather, warfare, agriculture, tribute and so on. One of the most common topics was whether performing rituals in a certain manner would be satisfactory.

An intense heat source was then inserted in a pit until it cracked. Due to the shape of the pit, the front side of the bone cracked in a rough  shape. A number of cracks were typically made in one session, sometimes on more than one bone, and these were typically numbered. The diviner in charge of the ceremony read the cracks to learn the answer to the divination. How exactly the cracks were interpreted is not known. The topic of divination was raised multiple times, and often in different ways, such as in the negative, or by changing the date being divined about. One oracle bone might be used for one session or for many, and one session could be recorded on a number of bones. The divined answer was sometimes then marked either "auspicious" or "inauspicious", and the king occasionally added a "prognostication", his reading on the nature of the omen. On very rare occasions, the actual outcome was later added to the bone in what is known as a "verification". A complete record of all the above elements is rare; most bones contain just the date, diviner and topic of divination, and many remained uninscribed after the divination.

The uninscribed divination is thought to have been brush-written with ink or cinnabar on the oracle bones or accompanying documents, as a few of the oracle bones found still bear their brush-written divinations without carving, while some have been found partially carved. After use, shells and bones used ritually were buried in separate pits (some for shells only; others for scapulae only), in groups of up to hundreds or even thousands (one pit unearthed in 1936 contained over 17,000 pieces along with a human skeleton).

Changes in the nature of divination
	The targets and purposes of divination changed over time. In the reign of Wu Ding diviners were likely to ask the powers or ancestors about things like the weather, success in battle, or building settlements. Offerings were promised if they would help with earthly affairs.

Crack-making on jiazi (day 1) Zheng divined “In praying for harvest to the Sun (we) will cleave ten dappled cows and pledge one hundred dappled cows.”

Keightley explains that this divination is unique in being addressed to the Sun, but typical in that 10 cattle are being offered, with 100 more to follow if the harvest is good. 

Later divinations were more likely to be perfunctory, optimistic, made by the king himself, addressed to his ancestors, on a regular cycle, and unlikely to ask the ancestors to do anything. Keighley suggests that this reflects a change in ideas about what the powers and ancestors could do and the extent to which the living could influence them.

Archaeological evidence of pre-Anyang pyromancy
While the use of bones in divination has been practiced almost globally, such divination involving fire or heat has generally been found in Asia and the Asian-derived North American cultures. The use of heat to crack scapulae (pyro-scapulimancy) originated in ancient China, the earliest evidence of which extends back to the 4th millennium BCE, with archaeological finds from Liaoning, but these were not inscribed. In Neolithic China at a variety of sites, the scapulae of cattle, sheep, pigs and deer used in pyromancy have been found, and the practice appears to have become quite common by the end of the third millennium BCE. Scapulae were unearthed along with smaller numbers of pitless plastrons in the Nánguānwài stage at Zhengzhou, Henan; scapulae as well as smaller numbers of plastrons with chiseled pits were also discovered in the Lower and Upper Erligang stages.

Significant use of tortoise plastrons does not appear until the Shang culture sites. Ox scapulae and plastrons, both prepared for divination, were found at the Shang culture sites of Táixīcūn in Hebei and Qiūwān in Jiangsu. One or more pitted scapulae were found at Lùsìcūn in Henan, while unpitted scapulae have been found at Erlitou in Henan, Cíxiàn in Hebei, Níngchéng in Liaoning, and Qíjiā in Gansu. Plastrons do not become more numerous than scapulae until the Rénmín Park phase.

At other sites
Four inscribed bones have been found at Zhengzhou in Henan: three with numbers 310, 311 and 312 in the Hebu corpus, and one containing a single character which also appears in late Shang inscriptions.  HB 310, which contained two brief divinations, has been lost, but is recorded in a rubbing and two photographs.  HB 311 and 312 each contain a short sentence similar to the late Shang script.  HB 312 was found in an upper layer of the Erligang culture.  The others were found accidentally in river management earthworks, and so lack archaeological context.  Pei Mingxiang argued that they predated the Anyang site.  Takashima, referring to character forms and syntax, argues that they were contemporaneous with the reign of Wu Ding.

A few inscribed oracle bones have also been unearthed in the Zhōuyuán, the original political center of the Zhou in Shaanxi and in Daxinzhuang, Jinan, Shandong.
Some bones from the Zhouyuan are believed to be contemporaneous with the reign of Di Xin, the last Shang king.

Post-Shang oracle bones
After the founding of Zhou, the Shang practices of bronze casting, pyromancy and writing continued. Oracle bones found in the 1970s have been dated to the Zhou dynasty, with some dating to the Spring and Autumn period. However, very few of those were inscribed. It is thought that other methods of divination supplanted pyromancy, such as numerological divination using milfoil (yarrow) in connection with the hexagrams of the I Ching, leading to the decline in inscribed oracle bones. However, evidence for the continued use of plastromancy exists for the Eastern Zhou, Han, Tang and Qing dynasty periods, and Keightley mentions use in Taiwan as late as 1972.

See also 
 Kau Cim
 Jiaobei
 Tung Shing
 Futomani
 Bamboo and wooden slips

Notes

References

Works cited
 Pbk. ed. with minor corr. and a new preface. 

 
 Paperback 2nd edition (1985) .

 

 Now issued by Joint Publishing, Hong Kong.
 Illustrated guide to the Special Exhibition of Oracle Bone Inscriptions from the Institute of History and Philology, Academia Sinica. Govt. Publ. No. 1009100250.
York, Geoffrey. "The Unsung Canadian Some Knew as 'Old Bones'". The Globe and Mail. March 27, 2017. Retrieved February 18, 2017.

External links

 Oracle bones, United College Library, Chinese University of Hong Kong. Includes 45 inscribed fragments.
 Oracle Bone Collection, Institute of History and Philology, Taipei City.
 High-resolution digital images of oracle bones, Cambridge Digital Library.
 Couling-Chalfant oracle bone collection 甲骨 (Or 7694/1506–2125), British Library.
 Yīnxū shūqì 殷虛書契 by Luo Zhenyu – a collection of rubbings or oracle bone fragments.
 Guījiǎ shòugǔ wénzì 龜甲獸骨文字 by Hayashi Taisuke – another collection of rubbings.
 四方风 or Winds of the Four Directions World Digital Library. National Library of China.

Archaeology of China
Chinese inscriptions
Chinese inventions
Objects used for divination
Shang dynasty
Writing media
Oraculology
Bone carvings